Camptostylus is a genus of flowering plants belonging to the family Achariaceae.

Its native range is Western Tropical Africa to Angola.

Species:

Camptostylus kivuensis 
Camptostylus mannii 
Camptostylus ovalis

References

Achariaceae
Malpighiales genera